Arthur Wellesley, 1st Duke of Wellington, KG, GCB, GCH, PC, FRS ( 1 May 1769 – 14 September 1852), acquired many titles and honours including the rank of field marshal or equivalent in eight nations' armies. Each nation provided him with a baton as a symbol of his rank. The surviving batons are on display at Apsley House the former London residence of the Dukes of Wellington.

Military rank
At Wellington's funeral his military ranks were described as:
 Field Marshal and Commander-in-Chief of Her [Britannic] Majesty's Forces
 Field Marshal of the Austrian Army
 Field Marshal of the Hanoverian Army
 Field Marshal of the Army of the Netherlands
 Marshal-General of the Portuguese Army
 Field Marshal of the Prussian Army
 Field Marshal of the Russian Army
 Captain-General of the Spanish Army

Wellington's lying in state
At Wellington's lying in state, his batons of military rank were placed alongside the coffin on eight velvet cushions each on a pedestal on gold lion supporters. The pedestals were more than two feet in height, each bearing the shield and banners of their respective nations. On two additional similar pedestals were placed Wellington's standard and guidon. The batons were described thus:

In Wellington's funeral procession, the Spanish baton was borne by Major-General the Duke of Osuna; the Russian baton by General Prince Gorchakov; the Prussian baton by General Count von Nostitz; the Portuguese baton by Marshal-General the Duke of Terceira; the Netherlands baton by Lieutenant-General Baron van Omphal; the Hanoverian baton by General Sir Hugh Halkett; and the English baton by Field-Marshal the Marquess of Anglesey.

Display
For many years the batons were all on display at Apsley House. However, on 9 December 1965 there was a robbery in which three items were stolen, one of which was the Russian Marshal's Baton. It has not been recovered.

The seven remaining field marshal batons along with two more British batons (one presented to the Duke in 1821 by George IV) are on permanent display at Apsley House:

English baton (1813)
The 1813 baton is described as English and not British because engraved on the end of it are the following words:

The English baton was presented to the future Duke of Wellington for his military successes, but more specifically because after his victory at Vittoria he presented the captured Marshal's baton of Jean-Baptiste Jourdan to George, the Prince Regent (at the time prince regent as his father George III was deemed too mentally ill to govern). The Prince Regent wrote to Wellington "You have sent me among your trophies of unrivalled fame the staff of a French marshal, and I send you in return that of England".

Russian baton
The Duke's Russian baton was stolen in 1965 and has not been recovered. The auctioneers Christie's stated that, "during the reign of Alexander I (1801–1825), only four Russian Generals and the Duke of Wellington received the coveted baton". A Russian baton circa 1878 (six were issued under Alexander II (1855–1881)) sold for $903,500 in a New York auction in 2004.

See also

List of titles and honours of Arthur Wellesley, 1st Duke of Wellington
Military career of Arthur Wellesley, 1st Duke of Wellington

Notes

References

Further reading
 has a representation of the 8 field marshal batons which can be found duplicated at

 Lists of the bearers of Wellington's batons at his funeral.

Wellesley
Arthur Wellesley, 1st Duke of Wellington
Wellington Collection